Clardeluna was an Occitan poet, playwright and journalist Joana Barthes's pen name. She was born in 1898 in Casa d'Arnas in Hérault, France and died in 1972. She ran the Trencavel magazine. "Clar de luna" translates as "moonlight" in English.

Works

Poetry
Escriveta, 1926
L'Imatgièr, 1927
Lo Miralh magic, 1968
Lo Miralh del temps, 1968

Drama
Las Gentilhas, 1928
En Velhant lo mòrt, 1933
Las Lofas frejas, 1933
La Nuèit d'estiu, 1938

Clardeluna